The 2018 Ohio Valley Conference baseball tournament will be held from May 22 through 27.  The top eight regular season finishers met in the double-elimination tournament, held at Choccolocco Park in Oxford, Alabama.  As tournament champion, Morehead State earned the conference's automatic bid to the 2017 NCAA Division I baseball tournament  Among current members, Austin Peay has won the most championships, with six, while Belmont (joined in 2012), SIU Edwardsville (joined in 2008),and Tennessee–Martin (joined in 1992) have never won championships.  The Tournament began in 1979.

Seeding and format
The top eight regular season finishers will be seeded by conference winning percentage.  After a play-in round between the bottom two seeds, the remaining seven teams will play a double-elimination tournament, with the top seed receiving a single bye.

Results
Play in round

References

Tournament
Ohio Valley Conference Baseball Tournament
Ohio Valley Conference baseball tournament
Ohio Valley Conference baseball tournament